Reignier station is a railway station in the commune of Reignier-Esery, in the French department of Haute-Savoie. It is located on standard gauge Aix-les-Bains–Annemasse line of SNCF.

Services 
 the following services stop at Reignier:

References

External links 
 
 

Railway stations in Haute-Savoie